Brigitte Olivier (born 20 January 1980) is a Belgian judoka. She competed in the women's heavyweight event at the 2000 Summer Olympics.

Achievements

References

1980 births
Living people
Belgian female judoka
Olympic judoka of Belgium
Judoka at the 2000 Summer Olympics
20th-century Belgian women
21st-century Belgian women